Kithson Anthony Bain (born 26 May 1982) is a Grenadian footballer currently playing for Caledonia AIA in the Trinidad and Tobago Premier League. He has been capped at full international level by the Grenada national football team.

Club career
Bain began his footballing career for Grenadian side Queens Park Rangers before moving to fellow Grenadian side Ball Dogs.

Tranmere Rovers
In 2008 Bain had finished top scorer in the 2008 Caribbean Cup tournament with 5 goals. The then Tranmere Rovers manager John Barnes had also been involved in the tournament and his Jamaica national team won the tournament. Barnes was impressed enough with Bain to bring him to England, he signed for the Birkenhead-based club in August 2009.

Bain made his first appearance for Tranmere in their 3–2 home defeat by Walsall on 12 September 2009.

On 26 November, Bain went out on loan to Conference National side Kettering Town until January 2010.

Despite scoring seven goals for the Tranmere reserves, Bain was only given handful of substitute appearances by Rovers manager Les Parry, ending the season on 10 games, all from the bench. Bain failed to score in his time at Tranmere, although there was dispute over whether he got the last touch on Alan Mahon's goal in Rovers 3–2 win against Walsall. He was released by Tranmere at the end of the 2009/10 season.

He then returned home to Grenada in the summer of 2010 and rejoined his former club Queens Park Rangers. Near the end of 2010 he played in Guyana's Kashif and Shanghai cup competition for Alpha United as a guest player alongside Dominica international Kurlson Benjamin.

Carolina RailHawks
After impressive performances for Grenada in The Caribbean Cup, Bain caught the eye of reigning American second division NASL Conference champions Carolina RailHawks who signed Bain for the 2011 season. The RailHawks joined the North American Soccer League in 2011. He only played 11 minutes for them in the whole season.

He signed for Trinidadian club Caledonia AIA in September 2013.

International career
Bain has represented Grenada at both Under 23 and full international level. In the 2010 Caribbean Championship he was declared joint winners of the Digicel Golden Boot award.

Scores and results list Grenada's goal tally first.

Under-23 international goals

Full international goals

References

External links

Tranmere Rovers club profile
 Profile – NASL

1982 births
Living people
Grenadian footballers
Association football forwards
Tranmere Rovers F.C. players
Kettering Town F.C. players
Alpha United FC players
North Carolina FC players
Morvant Caledonia United players
English Football League players
North American Soccer League players
TT Pro League players
Grenada international footballers
2009 CONCACAF Gold Cup players
Grenadian expatriate footballers
Grenadian expatriate sportspeople in England
Grenadian expatriate sportspeople in Guyana
Grenadian expatriate sportspeople in Antigua and Barbuda
Grenadian expatriate sportspeople in the United States
Grenadian expatriate sportspeople in Trinidad and Tobago
Expatriate footballers in England
Expatriate footballers in Guyana
Expatriate footballers in Antigua and Barbuda
Expatriate soccer players in the United States
Expatriate footballers in Trinidad and Tobago